Hebbur  is a village in the southern state of Karnataka, India. It is located in the Tumkur taluk of Tumkur district in Karnataka.

The Sri Kamakshi Sharada Mutt, whose presiding deity is the goddess Kamakshi Sharada, is in the town. A very rare piece of Hindu iconography, called the 'Shri Chakra' made of panchaloha, an alloy of five metals, is installed in the shrine. It is supposed to represent the Primeval Energy from which the whole universe issues forth, and is held very auspicious by many Hindus. This icon is believed to have been found in a deep well in this tiny town.

This town has the Shri Veeranjaneya Swamy temple at Kote area. The Shri Hanumantha Devaru Statue is big and is believed to be installed by Shri Vyasaraja Theertha Swamy, some 500 years ago during the period of the great Vijayanagara emperor Shri Krishnadevaraya.

This town has the Shri Veerabhadra Swamy Temple at the entrance of the village where people worship with Lord Veerabhadra Swamy. Every Year they conduct Jathra Mahotsava at time of Summer Holidays which means between April to June also you can find very old chariot which has been made up of Stone Wheel and the statue of Brahma Rakshasa which is also very older the 200Years ago.

Another special about this village is you can find 101 Temple and 101 Kalyani which has been constructed during the rule of Vijayanagara emperor Krishnadevaraya all the temple and kalyani are destroyed at the time of british rule now we need to search to see the old sculptures in Hebburu.

This town was earlier called as 'Ghanapuri', which is a Sanskrit translation of its Kannada name, Hebburu. The town had more than 100 temples, most of which are in bad shape now.

Demographics
At the 2021 India census Hebbur had a population of 11350 (5840 males,5510  females).

Image gallery
Directions:

The Hebbur is located between Kunigal and Tumkur. So you can reach via Tumkur (NH 4) or Kunigal (NH 48). The Kunigal route is bit shorter.

If you travel via Kunigal, then you need to get-off the highway after the Kunigal KIADB to go through an underpass to get on to the road to Kunigal town. Within Kunigal town at the first three road junction (or circle) take the right turn to reach Hebbur. In Hebbur, pass the town to take U turn and then left turn to reach the temple.

If you travel via Tumkur then you need to get-off the highway after the Tumkur toll-plaza, to get on to Tumkur Ring Road before Kyathasandra. When you are on the Tumkur Ring Road take left turn at the junction of Kunigal Road near Maralur to reach Hebbur. In Hebbur, take the left turn to reach the temple.

See also
 Tumkur
 Districts of Karnataka

References

External links
 http://Tumkur.nic.in/

Villages in Tumkur district